James Sherwood Westmacott (1823–1900) was a British sculptor during the 19th century and part of the Westmacott dynasty stemming from Richard Westmacott (the elder).

Life

He was born in London on 27 August 1823, the son of Henry Westmacott, a monumental sculptor, in turn the son of Richard Westmacott (the elder).

He studied sculpture under his uncle, Sir Richard Westmacott, rather than his father, Richard being by far the more eminent sculptor.

He made a study trip to Rome in 1849.

He died at Longlands in Chesterfield on 16 August 1900.

Works
Statues "Alfred the Great" and "Richard I planting the Standard", for the Westminster Hall Exhibition, 1844
Statues of Geoffrey, Earl of Gloucester and Saher, Earl of Winchester, House of Lords, 1848
Bust of George Barnard, exhibited at the Royal Academy, 1854
Bust of the Marquess of Anglesey, 1858
Font, St Mary's Church, Stoke Newington, 1858
Fountain Nymph, 1861
Monument to Owen Wethered, father of Thomas Owen Wethered, Marlow, Buckinghamshire, 1862
Statue of Alexander, the Mansion House, 1863
Statue of Bomanjee Hormasjee, Bombay, 1865
Monument to Gilbert East, Hurley, Berkshire, 1866
Reredos, Little Wolston Church, Buckinghamshire, 1868
Three figures (Galen, Cicero and Aristotle) for the frontage of the Civil Service Buildings on Burlington Gardens, London, 1869
Reredos, Newcastle Cathedral, 1870
Bust of J. Langton Down, 1883

Exhibitions
Royal Academy, London, 1846–1885
The Great Exhibition of 1851
"Peri at the Gates of Paradise", Paris Exhibition of 1855
The International Exhibition, London, 1862

References

Dictionary of British Sculptors, 1660–1851, Rupert Gunnis
The Buildings of England, Nikolaus Pevsner

External links

http://sculpture.gla.ac.uk/view/person.php?id=msib2_1202173155

1823 births
1900 deaths
British architectural sculptors
Monumental masons
19th-century British sculptors
British male sculptors
19th-century British male artists